The Coroner's Court for the City of London is located at Walbrook Wharf, 78-83 Upper Thames Street.

References 

City of London
Coroner's courts in London